Daniel Adrian Minea (born 26 December 1961) is a Romanian footballer who played as a midfielder in the 1980s and 1990s.

He started his career with Steaua Bucharest, before moving to FC Olt Scorniceşti. He returned to Steaua in 1989 and he went on to play for them in their 1989 European Cup Final defeat by Milan. He was still at the club in 1990–91 when he played two games in that season's Cup Winners Cup, one of which was the 1st round, 2nd leg match against Glentoran.

Minea played a total of 243 Divizia A matches for Steaua Bucharest and FC Olt, scoring 17 goals.

In 1991, he joined Belgian side K. Sint-Niklase S.K.E. and he remained with them for five seasons before retiring in 1996. He made 118 league appearances for them scoring 10 goals.

His brother, Iulian, was also a professional footballer, they played together at Steaua București.

Honours

Club
Steaua București
Divizia A: 1988–89
Cupa României: 1988–89
European Cup runner-up:  1988–1989

References

Romanian footballers
FC Steaua București players
FC Olt Scornicești players
Expatriate footballers in Belgium
Living people
1961 births
K. Sint-Niklase S.K.E. players
Association football midfielders